Harald Eggers (born 7 July 1942) is a German sprinter. He competed in the men's 100 metres at the 1968 Summer Olympics representing East Germany. Eggers became East German 100 metres champion in 1966 and 1967, and 200 metres champion in 1967. He represented the club SC Leipzig.

References

External links
 

1942 births
Living people
Athletes from Berlin
German male sprinters
Olympic athletes of East Germany
Athletes (track and field) at the 1968 Summer Olympics
SC Leipzig athletes